Little Yeldham is a small village in north west Essex, approximately one mile north east of Great Yeldham.

External links

Website for St. John the Baptist Church, Little Yeldham, part of the Upper Colne Valley Parishes

Villages in Essex
Braintree District